Paul W. Downs (born November 21, 1982) is an American actor, writer, director, and producer.  He is the co-creator, co-showrunner and star of the critically-acclaimed HBO Max series Hacks, for which he has received a Primetime Emmy, Golden Globe, and Peabody Award, among others. Downs first gained notoriety for his role in the Comedy Central series Broad City, which ran for five seasons and for which he was also a writer, director and executive producer.

Career
Downs has been creating digital shorts with Lucia Aniello under the moniker Paulilu since the pair met at the Upright Citizens Brigade. In 2012, they made a web series called Paulilu Mixtape for Above Average Productions, a division of Broadway Video.

From 2014–2019, Downs played Trey Pucker on the Comedy Central sitcom Broad City. Trey is a fitness instructor and the boss turned romantic interest of Abbi Abrams (played by Abbi Jacobson) at Soulstice.

On April 29, 2015, it was announced that Downs and Aniello would be writing a female spin-off of 21 Jump Street. On June 22, 2015, it was announced that the duo sold their script for Move That Body, a feature film acquired by Sony. Retitled Rough Night and released in 2017, Aniello directed, while Downs co-starred opposite Scarlett Johansson in the film.

In 2016 he wrote and starred in his own 30-minute episode of the sketch show Netflix Presents: The Characters.

On April 20, 2016 Downs starred in the Comedy Central miniseries Time Traveling Bong alongside Broad City co-star Ilana Glazer.

In 2018, Downs co-starred in Netflix’s summer comedy Like Father opposite Kristen Bell, Kelsey Grammer, and Seth Rogen.

Downs is showrunning and co-starring in the HBO Max show Hacks, starring Jean Smart. The first season of Hacks garnered 15 Emmy nominations and 3 wins, including “Outstanding
Writing for a Comedy Series,” “Outstanding Directing for a Comedy Series,” and Jean Smart won “Outstanding Lead Actress in a
Comedy Series.” The series won two Writers Guild of America Awards in the categories of
“Comedy Series” and “New Series,” and Aniello won a Directors Guild of America Award in
the category of “Outstanding Directorial Achievement in Comedy Series.” The series also took home two Golden Globe Awards for “Best Musical or Comedy TV Series” and “Best Television Actress in a Musical or Comedy”. Hacks was honored as one of the “Outstanding Television Programs of the Year” at the American Film Institute Awards and won a 2022 Peabody Award. Season 1 of Hacks also received various award nominations at the Screen Actors Guild Awards, Critics Choice Awards, Producers Guild of America Awards, and the Gotham Awards, among others.

In its second season, Hacks received 17 Emmy nominations and 3 wins, including “Outstanding Lead Actress In A Comedy Series,” “Outstanding Guest Actress In A Comedy Series” and “Outstanding Contemporary Costumes.”  The series was honored as one of the “Outstanding Television Programs of the Year” at the American Film Institute Awards for its second consecutive year and Jean Smart won a Critics Choice Award for “Best Actress in a Comedy Series” for her second consecutive year. The series was nominated for three Golden Globe Awards, two Writers Guild of America Awards, two Screen Actors Guild Awards, and a Producer Guild of America Award, among numerous others. 

More recently, he and his comedy partner Lucia Aniello struck a deal with Warner Bros. Television.

Personal life
Raised in Sussex, New Jersey, Downs attended the Pingry School.

Downs studied theater at Duke University where he did improv as a member of Duke University Improv (DUI). He lives in Los Angeles with Aniello, his wife and comedy partner.

Awards and nominations

References

External links

Living people
American male television actors
American television writers
American male television writers
American sketch comedians
Place of birth missing (living people)
21st-century American male actors
People from Sussex, New Jersey
Pingry School alumni
Male actors from New Jersey
Duke University alumni
American male screenwriters
American film producers
American male film actors
Upright Citizens Brigade Theater performers
21st-century American comedians
1982 births
21st-century American screenwriters
21st-century American male writers
Showrunners